Chloe Melissa Nørgaard is an American-Danish model. She is well known for her colorful hair. She has a wildflower initiative called Wildflower Boom. She spoke one a panel at the United Nations in September 2017 on The Sustainable Development Goals during Climate Week.

Early life
Chloe Nørgaard was born in Los Angeles in 1990 to a Danish father and American mother. She grew up in Long Island. In first grade, she spray-painted her hair blue.

Career
At age 19, she was noticed and sent to Tokyo. There, she trained modeling but she also became a DJ.

In 2012, she posed for several magazines including Vice, Nylon, Metal and Harper's Bazaar. She was also featured in a spread for webzine Contributor in which she was dressed by Courtney Love and photographed by Magnus Magnusson.

In February 2013, she walked exclusively for Rodarte during New York Fashion Week. The same year, she advertised Uniqlo, Forever 21 and Philipp Plein.

WildflowerBoom
Wildflowerboom was started as an environmental art project. To cover the world, especially cities, in native plants, like wildflowers. Not only are flowers beautiful but they also help our pollinators thrive.

References

External links

 Wildflowerboom

1990 births
American female models
Living people
Musicians from Los Angeles
People from Long Island
21st-century American women